Binita is a name given to females in India and Nepal.

Notable people with the name include:

 Binita Toppo (born 1980), Indian hockey player
 Binita Soren, Indian mountaineer
 Binita Desai, Indian animator and educator

See also 
 Vinita (disambiguation)

Indian feminine given names
Nepalese feminine given names